TBC1 domain family member 3E/3F is a protein that in humans is encoded by the TBC1D3F gene.

This gene encodes a protein that is similar to TBC1 domain family, member 3. This protein contains a TBC (Tre-2, Bub2p, and Cdc16p) domain, which is found in proteins involved in RAB GTPase signaling and vesicle trafficking. There are two copies of this gene located within a cluster of chemokine genes on chromosome 17q; this record represents the more centromeric copy.

References

Further reading